The 344th Fighter Squadron is an inactive United States Air Force unit. Its last assignment was with 343d Fighter Group stationed at Shemya Army Airfield, Alaska Territory.

History
Activated as a P-40 Warhawk fighter squadron in Alaska during World War II. Engaged in combat missions during Aleutian Campaign, 1942–1943. Switched to long-range P-38 Lightning fighters in 1944 and flew long-range attacks against Japanese shipping and airfields in northern Japan from its base at Shemya. Inactivated in 1946.

Lineage
 Constituted 344th Fighter Squadron on 2 Oct 1942
 Activated on 10 Oct 1942
 Inactivated on 15 Aug 1946.

Assignments
 343d Fighter Group, 10 Oct 1942 – 15 Aug 1946

Stations
 Elmendorf Field, Alaska Territory, 10 Oct 1942
 Detachment at Fort Randall Army Airfield, Alaska Territory, 12 Nov 1942
 Fort Randall Army Airfield, Alaska Territory, c. 25 Dec 1942
 Fort Glenn Army Airfield, Alaska Territory, 8 Mar-c. 23 May 1943
 Detachment at Amchitka Army Airfield, Alaska Territory, May-Jul 1943
 Detachment at Alexai Point Army Airfield, Attu, Alaska Territory, c. 12 Jun – Dec 1943
 Shemya Army Airfield, Alaska Territory, 25 Jun 1943 – 15 Aug 1946.

Aircraft
 P-40 Warhawk, 1942–1944
 P-38 Lightning, 1944–1946

References

External links

Military units and formations established in 1942
Fighter squadrons of the United States Army Air Forces